Francisco Afan Delgado (January 25, 1886 – October 27, 1964) was a Filipino diplomat who served as a Resident Commissioner from the Philippine Islands from 1935 to 1936.

Early life
He was born in Bulacan Province, in then Captaincy General of the Philippines on January 25, 1886 to a Spanish-Filipino mestizo family. His parents were Nemesio Delgado and Manuela Afan. He was the cousins of Jose Maria Delgado and his son Antonio C. Delgado, Philippine Ambassadors to The Vatican, and a descendant of General Martin Delgado.

Education
He studied at San Juan de Letran, Ateneo de Manila, Colegio Filipino, Los Angeles (California) High School, and Compton (California) Union High School; Indiana University at Bloomington, LL.B., 1907 and Yale Law School, LL.M., 1909; was admitted to the bar in 1908 and commenced practice in Indianapolis, Indiana.

Political career
Delgado returned to the Philippine Islands in 1908 and was employed with the Philippine Government as a law clerk and later as chief of the law division of the executive bureau until 1913, when he returned to the private practice of law. He served in the Philippine National Guard in 1918 and a member of the National Council of Defense for the Philippines in 1918. He also served in the Philippine house of representatives 1931–1935 and was elected as a Nationalist a Resident Commissioner to the United States and served from January 3, 1935 until February 14, 1936, when a successor qualified in accordance with the new form of government of the Commonwealth of the Philippine Islands. He was appointed justice of the court of appeals February 1936 – 1937. He resumed the practice of law; delegate to the International Committee of Jurists at Washington, D.C., and to the United Nations Conference at San Francisco in April 1945 and a member of the Philippine War Damage Commission from June 4, 1946, to March 31, 1951. He became a member of the Philippine Senate from 1951 to 1957. And lastly, he became Ambassador to the United Nations, September 29, 1958 – January 1, 1962.

Achievements
In court, Delgado was unmatched in upholding the ideals and noble precepts of his profession. He strongly denounced lawyers who worked for money sake and the many foul tactics employed by government prosecutors. Philippine Ambassador Francisco A. Delgado Wednesday jointed the exclusive "club" of victims of Soviet Premier Krushchev's table-pounding outbursts (United Nations, Oct. 6). Krushchev pounded the bench with his fists several times in response to Delgados fiery speech "denouncing the evils of Western colonial imperialism in season and out of season, the Communists are merely playing the cunning game of wolf in sheeps clothing." Ambassador Delgado was quoted in saying after his speech: "I think Krushchev's table pounding was the best endorsement of the truth of my speech."

Ambassador Delgado was also an active member of the Freemasons, being a Shriner and The Grandmaster of the Grand Lodge of Freemasonry between 1926 and 1927 and founder of the Masonic Hospital for Children in Manila. He was the first Filipino made an active member of the American Bar Association in 1919 and organizer/director of the International Bar association.

Death
Upon his retirement, he resided in the province of Bulacan, north of Manila; died in Manila, October 27, 1964.

See also
Resident Commissioner of the Philippines
List of Asian Americans and Pacific Islands Americans in the United States Congress
List of Hispanic Americans in the United States Congress

External links

1886 births
1964 deaths
20th-century American politicians
Colegio de San Juan de Letran alumni
Filipino judges
Justices of the Court of Appeals of the Philippines
Members of the House of Representatives of the Philippines from Bulacan
Filipino people of Spanish descent
Hispanic and Latino American members of the United States Congress
Members of the United States Congress of Filipino descent
People from Bulacan
Permanent Representatives of the Philippines to the United Nations
Quezon administration cabinet members
Resident Commissioners of the Philippines
Senators of the 2nd Congress of the Philippines
Senators of the 3rd Congress of the Philippines
Yale Law School alumni
Nacionalista Party politicians
Members of the Philippine Legislature